Ferriby is the name of two places, on opposite sides of the Humber Estuary

North Ferriby, in the East Riding of Yorkshire
South Ferriby, in North Lincolnshire

The two were historically linked by a ferry.